The men's 200 metre freestyle competition at the 1997 Pan Pacific Swimming Championships took place on August 10 at the NISHI Civic Pool.  The last champion was Danyon Loader of New Zealand.

This race consisted of four lengths of the pool, all in freestyle.

Records
Prior to this competition, the existing world and Pan Pacific records were as follows:

Results
All times are in minutes and seconds.

Heats
The first round was held on August 10.

B Final
The B final was held on August 10.

A Final
The A final was held on August 10.

References

1997 Pan Pacific Swimming Championships